The Zegrze Reservoir (or Zegrze Lake, in Polish officially Jezioro Zegrzyńskie, unofficially Zalew Zegrzyński) is a man-made reservoir in Poland, located just north of Warsaw, on the lower course of the Narew river.  It is formed by a dam constructed in 1963 with a hydroelectric complex producing 20 Megawatts of power.  Its total area is about 33 km². The name originates from the nearby Zegrze village, featuring the historic Radziwiłł Palace (Pałac Zegrzyński) built in 1847 by the noble Krasiński family.

See also
 Zegrzynek, birthplace of Jerzy Szaniawski nearby

References

External links

Targeo.pl (2016),  Map with location and outline of the lake.
Zalew Zegrzyński (2010), - AKTUALNOŚCI. Internet Archive. 
Zalew.Zegrzynski.pl (2010), Zalew Zegrzynski. Internet Archive. 
Around Warsaw (March 30, 2014) Information about Zegrze Reservoir. Internet Archive.

Reservoirs in Poland
Lakes of Poland
Lakes of Masovian Voivodeship